This is a list of provincial parks in the Golden Horseshoe region of Southern Ontario. These provincial parks are maintained by Ontario Parks. For a list of other provincial parks in Ontario, see the List of provincial parks in Ontario.

Ontario
Provincial parks, Golden Horseshoe
Provincial parks in Canada
Golden Horseshoe